Oenopotinae  is a subfamily of small to medium-sized sea snails, marine gastropod mollusks in the family Conidae.

This subfamily was introduced by Bogdanov in 1987. In 2014 this subfamily has been included in the family Mangeliidae

Description
The Oenopotinae are characterized by a thin, elongate-ovate to fusiform shell in the form of a tall spire with a size between 4.7mm and 24.5 mm. They show a present, vestigial or absent operculum and a shallow or inconspicuous sinus. This outer lip (labrum) is thin. The axial ribs are dominant in the sculpture of the shell. The toxoglossate radula has a weak basal ribbon and relatively short marginal teeth with solid base. The tooth cavity opens laterally between the shaft and the base.

Genera 
This is a list of the accepted names of genera in the subfamily Mangeliinae : (the main reference for recent species is the World Register of Marine Species 
 Curtitoma Bartsch, 1941
 Granotoma Bartsch, 1941
 Lorabela Powell, 1951
 Nematoma Bartsch, 1941 : synonym of Curtitoma Bartsch, 1941
 Obesotoma Bartsch, 1941
 Oenopota Mörch, 1852
 Oenopotella A. Sysoev, 1988
 Propebela Iredale, 1918
 Venustoma Bartsch, 1941

References 

Vaught, K.C. (1989). A classification of the living Mollusca. American Malacologists: Melbourne, FL (USA). . XII, 195 pp

Mangeliidae